is a Japanese, Tokyo-based company, manufacturing power semiconductor devices, electric power systems, automotive electronics products and solenoid products.
It is listed on the Tokyo Stock Exchange and the company's largest shareholder is Honda.

Business segments and products 
The Company operates in three business segments:

 Power semiconductor manufacturing
 diode bridges 
 general rectifying diodes (rectifier), high-speed diodes and other diodes
 power management integrated circuit (power ICs), power MOSFETs and insulated-gate bipolar transistors
 Power system products
 DC-to-DC converters, AC-to-DC converters and power inverters
 Automotive electronics products
 regulator (automatic control) and CDI
 DC-to-DC converters
 sine wave inverters, ECUs

References

External links

  
  

Electronics companies of Japan
Semiconductor companies of Japan
Automotive companies based in Tokyo
Manufacturing companies based in Tokyo
Companies listed on the Tokyo Stock Exchange
Japanese companies established in 1949
Electronics companies established in 1949
Auto parts suppliers of Japan
Japanese brands
Honda